This List of botanical gardens and arboretums in China is intended to include all significant botanical gardens and arboretums in China.
Botanical gardens in China have collections consisting entirely of China native and endemic species; most have a collection that include plants from around the world. There are botanical gardens and arboreta in all provincial-level administration of China, most are administered by local governments, some are privately owned.

 China National Botanical Garden, Haidian District, Beijing
 South China National Botanical Garden, Guangzhou
 Qinling National Botanical Garden, Zhouzhi County, Xi'an, Shaanxi
 Xi'an Botanical Garden, Qujiang New District, Xi'an, Shaanxi
 Hong Kong Zoological and Botanical Gardens
 Shenyang Botanical Garden, Liaoning
 Nanjing Botanical Garden, Memorial Sun Yat-Sen, Jiangsu
 Xishuangbanna Tropical Botanical Garden, Yunnan
 Lijiang High-Alpine Botanical Garden, Yunnan
 Wuhan Botanical Garden, Hubei
 Mountain Lu Botanical Garden, Mountain Lu, Jiujiang, Jiangxi
 Chenshan Botanical Garden, Shanghai
 Lanzhou Botanical Garden, Lanzhou

See also 
List of Chinese gardens
Chinese garden

References 

China
Botanical gardens